Paul David Moore (born 10 June 1961) is a former Irish first-class cricketer.

Moore was born at Bangor in County Down in June 1961, and was educated at Sullivan Upper School. A wicket-keeper at club level for Holywood and North Down, he played one first-class cricket match for Ireland against Scotland at Dundee in 1992. In a drawn match, Moore batted once, ending Ireland's first-innings of 280 unbeaten without scoring. He also took two catches behind the stumps in Scotland's first-innings. He later played for Ireland in a minor match against the Marylebone Cricket Club in 1994. Outside of cricket, Moore works as an architect.

References

External links

1961 births
Living people
Sportspeople from County Down
People educated at Sullivan Upper School
Cricketers from Northern Ireland
Architects from Northern Ireland